Clubiona saxatilis is a sac spider species found in Europe.

See also 
 List of Clubionidae species

References

External links 

Clubionidae
Spiders of Europe
Spiders described in 1867